Gymnosporia thompsonii (Chamorro: luluhot) is a species of plant in the bittersweet family Celastraceae. It is endemic to the Mariana Islands and Guam, where it grows as a many-stemmed understory shrub or small tree in karst forests. Its wood is used for fuel and its leaves are used medicinally.

References

thompsonii
Flora of the Mariana Islands
Taxa named by Elmer Drew Merrill